Tobias Stieler (born 2 July 1981) is a football referee who is based in Hamburg. He referees for SG Rosenhöhe of the Hessian Football Association. He is a FIFA referee, and is ranked as a UEFA elite category referee.

Refereeing career
Stieler has been a DFB referee since 2004, a Bundesliga referee since 2012, and a FIFA referee since 2014.

Personal life
Stieler lives in Hamburg and works as a lawyer.

See also
List of football referees

References

External links
 Profile at DFB.de 
 Profile at WorldFootball.net

1981 births
Living people
People from Offenbach (district)
Sportspeople from Darmstadt (region)
German football referees
UEFA Europa League referees